Danush Peiris (born 21 September 1995) is a Sri Lankan cricketer. He made his first-class debut for Colombo Cricket Club in the 2015–16 Premier League Tournament on 25 February 2016.

References

External links
 

1995 births
Living people
Sri Lankan cricketers
Colombo Cricket Club cricketers
Cricketers from Colombo